Kyun may refer to:
KYUN, FM radio station in Twin Falls, Idaho
"Kyun" (song), a 2019 single by Japanese group Hinatazaka46
Kyun-Tas, a mountain range in Yakutia, Russia

See also
Kyung